Karan Singh Magic (born 19 July 1991) is an Indian magician. He is known for using his audience as a prop while performing on stage and has been titled 'Modern Day Wizard' by The New York Times and 'the mentalist who figured out Shah Rukh Khan's ATM Pin' by GQ India

Early life and education 
Singh was born in Mumbai,India. He spent the first four years of his life in Mumbai. His family moved to Delhi after his father's transfer. He attended the Mother's International School in Delhi. He enrolled in the Shri Guru Tegh Bahadur Khalsa College of the University of Delhi to work toward a bachelor's degree in Commerce. However, he dropped out of college in the third year to pursue magic full-time.

Professional career 

Singh's first exposure to magic occurred in 2002 at a summer camp in Tirthan near Kullu Manali where he met a magician named Ishammudin Khan who taught him his first two tricks. For his initial years, he performed only those two tricks until he stumbled upon David Blaine on television.

In 2007, at the age of 16, he performed his first show for the 12th graders' farewell at his school. Following this, he did a series of magic shows at kid's birthday parties dressed up as Aladdin.

Singh gained popularity after his first commercial show- 'Karan Singh Magic: Saltus' at Siri Fort Auditorium, New Delhi. Sponsored by Pepsi, it was India's first-ever commercial one-man mind-reading show, where Singh performed for former Pepsi Chairperson and CEO Indra Nooyi.

During the COVID-19 pandemic, all outdoor events were cancelled and thus, Singh could no longer perform public shows. He began performing as an online medium with a mind-reading show on Zoom. He has performed more than 800 digital shows as of 16 June 2021.

References

External links 
 Karan Singh's channel on YouTube

Karan Singh Boomer second channel on Youtube

Indian magicians
1991 births
Living people
Indian YouTubers